Chalishevia is an extinct genus of erythrosuchid archosauriform from the Ladinian Bukobay Formation of Russia (Orenburg Oblast).

References

Bibliography 
 Benton, M. J.; Shishkin, M. A.; Unwin, D. M.; Kurochkin, E. N. The Age of Dinosaurs in Russia and Mongolia. Cambridge University Press, 2001. 672 p.

Erythrosuchids
Ladinian genera
Middle Triassic reptiles of Europe
Triassic Russia
Fossils of Russia
Fossil taxa described in 1980
Prehistoric reptile genera